The 2008–09 Danish Cup was the 55th season of only Danish football cup competition. It was the first time since 2004 that the cup had a sponsor name: the daily newspaper Ekstra Bladet has signed a 3-year contract with the Danish Football Association (DBU), making the official name Ekstra Bladet Cup 2008–09.

The competition started in August 2008 with the First Round and concluded on May 21, 2009, with the Final, held at Parken Stadium.

First round
In this round entered 96 teams. These include 55 teams from lower divisions, who have qualified through preliminary cups held by the regional associations, 25 teams from Second Divisions 2007–08 and all 16 teams from First Division 2007–08.

The draw for the First Round was held at Ekstra Bladet's premises at The City Hall Square in Copenhagen. The matches were played around August 13, 2008.

West group
The west group consisted of 46 teams. These were split into 5 minor groups.

North group

Central group

South group

Funen group

East/south group

East group
The east group consisted of 40 teams.

Second round
The winners from the First Round progressed to the Second Round. Eight additional teams, placed fifth to twelfth in the 2007–08 Superliga, contested in this round.

The draw for the Second Round was held at Ekstra Bladet's premises at The City Hall Square in Copenhagen. The matches were played on August 23 and 24, 2008.

West group
The west group consisted of 28 teams.

East group
The east group consisted of 28 teams.

Third round
The winners from the Second Round progressed to the Third Round. Four additional teams, placed first to fourth in the 2007–08 Superliga, contested in this round.

The draw for this round was held at Ekstra Bladet's premises at The City Hall Square in Copenhagen. The matches were played between September 26 and 29, 2008.

Fourth round
The winners from the Third Round progressed to the Fourth Round.

The draw for this was held at Ekstra Bladet's premises at The City Hall Square in Copenhagen. The matches were played around October 29, 2008.

Fifth round
The draw for the Fifth Round was held at Ekstra Bladet's premises at The City Hall Square in Copenhagen. The matches were played on November 12, 2008.

Semifinals
The semifinals will be played on home and away basis. The first legs were played on April 15 and 16 and second on April 29, 2009.

First legs

Second legs

F.C. Copenhagen win 6–1 on aggregate

AaB 4–4 Brøndby IF. AaB won on away goals.

Final

The final was held at Parken Stadium on 21 May 2009.

External links
 Danish FA

References

Danish Cup, 2008-09
Cup
2009